This season marks the addition of four new teams, with Lajong SSC, Pune FC, Salgaocar Sports Club and Viva Kerala are confirmed to participate in the I-League. With the inception of these four clubs, many club transfers have been undergone within India, and around the world. The length of the regular season will be longer than in previous years, with 26 rounds rather than 22.

The season kicked off on 1 October 2009 with Mahindra United hosting defending champions Churchill Brothers in Mumbai.

Rule changes
India became the latest member association to adopt AFC's 3+1 rule which will allow clubs to recruit one player of Asian origin in addition to their regular quota of three foreigners.

The All India Football Federation (AIFF) executive committee decided to embrace the new AFC rule which encourages the mobility of talented Asian players and provides a fillip to the regional game.

AFC Campaign
Two of the I-League teams were playing in the 2010 AFC Cup. This had caused some delays in scheduling. East Bengal lost all its round robin matches and was out of the tournament, but Churchill Brothers were at Knockout stage.

Stadia and locations

Managerial changes

League table

Fixtures and results

Top goalscorers
As of 18 May 2010 (season end)

21 goals
  Odafa Onyeka Okolie (Churchill Brothers)

16 goals
  Muritala Ali (Mahindra United)
  Josimar (Chirag United Kerala)
  Ekene Ikenwa (Salgaocar)

15 goals
  Ranty Martins (Dempo)

14 goals
  Edmar Figueira (Pune)
  N.D.Opara (Air India)
  Mohammed Rafi (Mahindra United)
  Jose Ramirez Barreto (Mohun Bagan)

12 goals
  Chidi Edeh (Mohun Bagan)
  Edmilson (Chirag United Kerala)

11 goals
  Felix Chimaokwu (Churchill Brothers)

10 goals
  Arata Izumi (Pune)
  Junior Obagbemiro (Sporting Goa)

Hat tricks

See also
 2009 IFA Shield
 2009 Durand Cup
 I-League 2nd Division 2010

References

 
I-League seasons
1
India